is a Japanese voice actress and singer associated with Voice Kit. She won the Best Rookie Actress at the 10th Seiyu Awards. She made her singing debut in April 2013 under King Records.

Life and career 
Uesaka became a regular on the web radio program Web radio @ Dengeki-Bunko in September 2009. She entered the Faculty of Foreign Studies at Sophia University in April 2010. She majored in the Russian language and announced that she had graduated on March 27, 2014. Uesaka joined Space Craft Entertainment in April 2011. Since October 2011, she has been the radio personality on the web radio program A&G NEXT GENERATION Lady Go!!. Uesaka starred in a leading role for the anime series Papa no Iu Koto wo Kikinasai!.

She is known as a Russophile who has great interest in Russian culture as well as the former Soviet Union. Since hearing the State Anthem of the USSR in her first year of high school, she immersed herself in Russian studies. One of her voice-acting jobs was playing Nonna, the second-in-command of the Russia-themed team "Pravda" in Girls und Panzer. She finally visited the country in November 2013, giving a concert at the Moscow Japanese pop culture festival J-Fest.

In March 2016, after several cases of online sexual harassment, she announced that her personal Twitter account would no longer be updated but resumed in November 2016. However, on July 21, 2017, she deactivated her account.

On September 4, 2020, she announced that she has left Space Craft Entertainment, and is now working as a freelancer.

On March 1, 2021, she announced that she would be joining the agency Voice Kit.

Filmography

Television animation

2012
 Girls und Panzer as Nonna, Piyotan
 Kokoro Connect as Kaoru Setouchi 
 Listen to Me, Girls. I Am Your Father! as Sora Takanashi
 Love, Chunibyo & Other Delusions as Sanae Dekomori
 Sengoku Collection as Annihilate Princess Mogami Yoshiaki

2013
 Fantasista Doll as Manai Hatsuki
 Genshiken Nidaime as Rika Yoshitake
 GJ-bu as Tamaki Kannazuki
 Muromi-san as Sumida-san
 Outbreak Company as Elvia Hanaiman

2014
 Cross Ange as Momoka Oginome
 Gonna be the Twin-Tail!! as Sōji Mitsuka (Tail Red)
 Hozuki's Coolheadedness as Peach Maki
 Inugami-san to Nekoyama-san as Yachiyo Inugami
 Lord Marksman and Vanadis as Titta
 Love, Chunibyo & Other Delusions -Heart Throb- as Sanae Dekomori
 Nobunagun as Gariko
 Seitokai Yakuindomo* as Vice-president Mori
 Z/X Ignition as Reia Sento

2015
 Concrete Revolutio as Kikko Hoshino
 Dog Days, Sharu
 Kantai Collection as Fubuki, Sōryū, Hiryū
 Lovely Muco as Rena-chan
 Overlord as Shalltear Bloodfallen
 Plastic Memories as Eru Miru
 Q Transformer: Saranaru Ninkimono e no Michi as Arcee
 Shimoneta: A Boring World Where the Concept of Dirty Jokes Doesn’t Exist as Oboro Tsukimigusa
 Show by Rock!! as ChuChu
 Tesagure! Bukatsumono Spin-off Purupurun Sharumu to Asobou as Okonogi Tomomi 
 THE iDOLM@STER Cinderella Girls as Anastasia

2016
 Ange Vierge as Ageha Sanagi
 Concrete Revolutio: The Last Song as Kikko Hoshino
 KanColle: The Movie as Fubuki, Sōryū, Hiryū
 Luck & Logic as Athena
 Myriad Colors Phantom World as Mai Kawakami
 RS Project -Rebirth Storage- as Yuzuru Midō
 Show by Rock!! Short!! as ChuChu
 Show by Rock!!# as ChuChu
 This Art Club Has a Problem! as Colette
 Tsukiuta. The Animation as Tsubaki Tendouin
 ViVid Strike! as Yumina Enclave

2017
Aho-Girl as Disciplinary Committee President
Battle Girl High School as Yuri Himukai
Beyblade Burst God as Ataru Okinaka
Chaos;Child as Serika Onoe
Chō Shōnen Tantei-dan NEO as Mayumi Hanazaki
Hand Shakers as Chizuru
The Idolmaster Cinderella Girls Theater as Anastasia
In Another World with My Smartphone as Leen
Inuyashiki as Mari Inuyashiki
Restaurant to Another World as Aletta
Urahara as Mari Shirako

2018
BanG Dream! Girls Band Party! Pico and Pastel Life as Chisato Shirasagi
Boarding School Juliet as Anne Sieber
Himote House as Minamo Arai
Killing Bites as Ui Inaba
Pop Team Epic as Pipimi (Episode 3, part A) and Korona Yuhi
Ongaku Shōjo as Kiri Mukae
Overlord (Season 2 and 3) as Shalltear Bloodfallen
Souten no Ken Re:Genesis as Erika Arendt
Xuan Yuan Sword Luminary as Empress Long Cheng

2019
Azur Lane as HMS Warspite, HMS Queen Elizabeth (1913), USS Saratoga (CV-3), IJN Akashi
BanG Dream! 2nd Season as Chisato Shirasagi
Carole & Tuesday as Angela Carpenter
Grimms Notes The Animation as Curly
Isekai Quartet as Shalltear Bloodfallen
O Maidens in Your Savage Season as Rika Sonezaki
Senryu Girl as Tao Hanakai
Star Twinkle PreCure as Yuni / Cure Cosmo
Why the Hell are You Here, Teacher!? as Kana Kojima

2020
Asteroid in Love as Mari Morino
BanG Dream! 3rd Season and BanG Dream! Girls Band Party! Pico: Ohmori as Chisato Shirasagi
Fly Me to the Moon as Aya Arisugawa
Hatena Illusion as Kokomi Kikyōin
In/Spectre as Karin Nanase
Iwa-Kakeru! -Sport Climbing Girls- as Konomi Kasahara
Lapis Re:Lights as Camilla
Rail Romanesque as Suzushiro
Seton Academy: Join the Pack! as Anne Anetani
Shachibato! President, It's Time for Battle! as Valmi
Warlords of Sigrdrifa as Komachi Mikuri

2021
Azur Lane Bisoku Zenshin! as IJN Akashi
BanG Dream! Girls Band Party! Pico Fever! as Chisato Shirasagi
Don't Toy with Me, Miss Nagatoro as Hayase Nagatoro
Ex-Arm as Chikage Rokuoin
Kageki Shojo!! as Sawa Sugimoto
Kimi to Fit Boxing as Martina
Miss Kobayashi's Dragon Maid S as Chloe
My Next Life as a Villainess: All Routes Lead to Doom! X as Susanna Randall
PuraOre! Pride of Orange as Maya Walker
Restaurant to Another World 2 as Aletta
Show by Rock!! Stars!! as ChuChu
So I'm a Spider, So What? as Ariel
Takt Op. Destiny as Valkyrie
The Great Jahy Will Not Be Defeated! as Kyoko Jingu
The Idaten Deities Know Only Peace as Nickel

2022
Girls' Frontline as Mosin-Nagant, PPSh-41
Hanabi-chan Is Often Late as Versus Ikusa Takanawa
Overlord IV as Shalltear Bloodfallen
Princess Connect! Re:Dive Season 2 as Suzuna
Shine On! Bakumatsu Bad Boys! as Akira
Urusei Yatsura (2022) as Lum
Yatogame-chan Kansatsu Nikki 4 Satsume as Shō Kochikashi
Love After World Domination as Anna Hashimoto

2023
Don't Toy with Me, Miss Nagatoro 2nd Attack as Hayase Nagatoro
Fly Me to the Moon 2nd Season as Aya Arisugawa
In Another World with My Smartphone 2nd Season as Leen
KamiKatsu as Shiruriru
Rokudō no Onna-tachi as Ranna Himawari
Spy Classroom as Thea
Tearmoon Empire as Mia Luna Tearmoon
TenPuru as Kagura Baldwin
Yuri Is My Job! as Mitsuki Ayanokōji

2024
Shaman King: Flowers as Alumi Niumbirch

TBA
Alya Sometimes Hides Her Feelings in Russian as Alisa Mikhailovna Kujou

Original net animation
Eyedrops (2016) as Epsilon-Aminocaproic Acid
Cute Executive Officer (2021–2023) as Yuki Karuizawa
Ganbare Dōki-chan (2021) as Kōhai-chan

Film animation
 Takanashi Rikka Kai: Gekijō-ban Chūnibyō Demo Koi ga Shitai! (2013) as Sanae Dekomori
 Girls und Panzer der Film (2016) as Nonna, Piyotan
 Love, Chunibyo & Other Delusions! Take on Me (2018) as Sanae Dekomori
 BanG Dream! Film Live (2019) as Chisato Shirasagi
 Goblin Slayer: Goblin's Crown (2020) as Noble Fencer
 BanG Dream! Film Live 2nd Stage (2021) as Chisato Shirasagi
 Re:cycle of Penguindrum (2022) as Purin-Chu-Penguin

Video games
2012
 Game Demo Papa no Iu Koto wo Kikinasai! as Sora Takanashi
 Corpse Party Anthology: Sachiko's Game of Love Hysteric Birthday 2U as Ran Kobayashi
 Kokoro Connect Yochi Random as Kaoru Setouchi
 The Idolmaster Cinderella Girls as Anastasia
2013
 Kantai Collection as Sōryū, Hiryū, Fubuki class
2014
 Hyperdevotion Noire: Goddess Black Heart as Lid
 Danganronpa Another Episode: Ultra Despair Girls as Jataro Kemuri
 Atelier Shallie: Alchemists of the Dusk Sea as Shallotte Elminus
2015
 League of Legends as Jinx
 Xenoblade Chronicles X as Avatar voice (Japanese only)
Battle Girl High School as Yuri Himukai
2016
 Girls' Frontline as Mosin-Nagant, Makarov, PPSh-41, AS Val and PPS-43
 Genkai Tokki: Seven Pirates as Waffle
 Lego Dimensions as Bubbles
 Granblue Fantasy as Hallessena
 Grimms Notes as Curly
 Star Ocean: Anamnesis as Ivlish
 Onigiri Online as Oda Nobunaga
 Counter-Strike Online 2 as Yuri and Lisa
 Alternative Girls as Tsumugi Hiiragi
 Metal Waltz as Zoe Sherman
2017
 BanG Dream! Girls Band Party! as Chisato Shirasagi
 Azur Lane as USS Saratoga (CV-3), HMS Queen Elizabeth (1913), HMS Warspite (03), IJN Akashi, KMS Deutschland and SN Kirov
 Another Eden as Suzette
Chaos;Child as Serika Onoe
2018
 Food Fantasy (2018) as Osechi
 Princess Connect! Re:Dive as Suzuna / Suzuna Minami
 Street Fighter V: Arcade Edition as Falke
Master of Eternity as Emily
Fitness Boxing as Martina
2019
 Dead or Alive 6 as NiCO
 Project Sakura Wars as Houan Yui
 Sangokushi Heroes as Sun Shangxiang
2020
Yakuza: Like a Dragon as Saeko Mukouda and Nanoha Mukouda
Sdorica as PAFF
Cytus 2 as PAFF
Magia Record as Yuuna Kaharu
Crash fever as Dilong Caishen
Final Fantasy VII Remake as Kyrie Canaan
TOUHOU Spell Bubble as Remilia Scarlet
Fitness Boxing 2: Rhythm and Exercise as Martina
2021
Samurai Shodown as Hibiki Takane
Alchemy Stars as Lester, Sikare, Migard
NEO: The World Ends with You as Kanon Tachibana
 Fate/Grand Order as Izumo no Okuni
 Uma Musume Pretty Derby as Agnes Tachyon
2022
 Goddess of Victory: Nikke as Exia, Drake
 Samurai Maiden as Hagane

Overseas dubbing
2016
 The Powerpuff Girls as Bubbles (Kristen Li)
2018
 Mutafukaz as Luna
2019
 Valley of the Boom as Jenn (Siobhan Williams)
2020
 Trolls World Tour as Pennywhistle
2021
 Vivo as Gabi
 Arcane as Powder/Jinx

Tokusatsu 
2021

 Ultraman Trigger: New Generation Tiga as Carmeara Voice/Human Form
 Ultraman Decker as Carmeara Voice

Other works

Web radio
  (from September 2009 to December 2011)
 A&G NEXT GENERATION Lady Go!! (from October 2011 to October 2015
  (from April 2012)

Discography

Singles

Albums

Character singles

Other appearances

References

External links
  
  at King Records 
 Sumire Uesaka at Pixiv 
 

1991 births
Living people
Anime musicians
Japanese women pop singers
Japanese video game actresses
Japanese voice actresses
Sophia University alumni
Music YouTubers
Musicians from Kanagawa Prefecture
Voice actresses from Kanagawa Prefecture
21st-century Japanese actresses
21st-century Japanese women singers
21st-century Japanese singers
Japanese YouTubers
Russophilia